Valse romantique is a solo piano piece written by the French composer Claude Debussy (1862–1918) in 1890. It is in the key of F minor.

The piece is divided in several small parts, in a late romantic style rather than the impressionism for which he is known.

External links 
 

Compositions for solo piano
Compositions by Claude Debussy
1890 compositions